Le Col–Wahoo is a UCI women's cycling team based in the United Kingdom, founded in 2015.
The team is jointly sponsored by cycling apparel firm Le Col and fitness technology company Wahoo.

Sponsorship 
Unlike many teams that are named purely after their sponsors the team have managed to maintain the 'Drops' brand throughout the majority of its existence whilst supplementing the Drops name with title sponsors. In 2018 Trek Bikes became title sponsors of the team. In 2019 the team reverted to its previous name as Trek ended their sponsorship after one year in order to start their own team. When a prospective replacement sponsor also pulled out the team launched a crowdfunding campaign in order to stay afloat
 and raised £25,000. 
 
In December 2020 it was announced that the team's clothing supplier Le Col would step up to co-title sponsor for the 2021 season after agreeing to double their investment in the team. They were joined by American mattress and pillow manufacturer TEMPUR. The team confirmed that funding would not go as far as being able to pay a salary to riders, something Drops has always been transparent about its inability to do.

In August 2021 Le Col signed a two-year extension taking their sponsorship through to 2023. In doing so it was announced that they would be trebling their annual investment in the team. It was also announced that the teams tyre supplier Mavic would extend and increase their sponsorship of the team into 2022. In the following weeks the team announced a number of new rider signings and contract renewals with a number of 2 year contracts confirmed for the first time in the team's history. In January 2022 it was announced that Wahoo would become the teams co-title for 2022 with the team being renamed Le Col–Wahoo. It has not been confirmed whether the increased sponsorship would enable the team to pay salaries to its riders.

Team roster 2022
The following riders have been confirmed for the 2022 season
As of 29 December 2021.

Major wins

2016
UCI Track Cycling World Cup – Glasgow (Team Pursuit), Eleanor Dickinson
Revolution Series – Manchester (Scratch race), Eleanor Dickinson

2017
 Mountains classification Setmana Ciclista Valenciana, Ann-Sophie Duyck
Stage 2, Ann-Sophie Duyck
 Provincial Time Trial Championship West-Vlaanderen, Ann-Sophie Duyck
Stage 4 Gracia–Orlová, Martina Ritter
Ljubljana–Domžale–Ljubljana TT, Ann-Sophie Duyck
Stage 3 (ITT) Tour de Feminin-O cenu Českého Švýcarska, Ann-Sophie Duyck
 Youth classification 2017 BeNe Ladies Tour, Alice Barnes
Stage 1, Alice Barnes
Stage 2 Tour of the Reservoir, Laura Massey

2018
Youth classification Cadel Evans Great Ocean Road Race, Eva Buurman
 Youth classification Setmana Ciclista Valenciana, Abby-Mae Parkinson
 Mountains classification Thüringen Rundfahrt der Frauen Kathrin Hammes

2019
 Youth classification Giro Toscana Int. Femminile - Memorial Michela Fanini, Lizzie Holden

2021
 Overall Tour de Feminin–Krásná Lípa, Joscelin Lowden
Stage 4 Joscelin Lowden
Omloop der Kempen, Maike van der Duin
UCI Track Cycling World Cup – Saint Petersburg (Elimination race), Maria Martins
UCI Track Cycling World Cup – Saint Petersburg (Omnium), Maria Martins

2022
Veenendaal–Veenendaal Classic, Gladys Verhulst

World & national champions

2016
 British U23 Road Race, Alice Barnes
 British Junior Road Race, Eleanor Dickinson
 Antigua & Barbuda Time Trial, Tamiko Butler
 Antigua & Barbuda Road Race, Tamiko Butler

2017
 Belgium Time Trial, Ann-Sophie Duyck
 British U23 Road Race, Alice Barnes
 Austria Time Trial, Martina Ritter
 Austria Road Race, Martina Ritter

2019
 World Track (Scratch race), Elinor Barker

2020
 Portugal Track (Points race), Maria Martins
 Portugal Track (Scratch race), Maria Martins

2021
 Portugal Road Race, Maria Martins
 European U23 Track (Scratch race), Maike van der Duin
 European U23 Track (Omnium), Maria Martins

2022
 Great Britain Road Race, Alice Towers

References

External links

Cycling teams established in 2015
Cycling teams based in the United Kingdom